Pavel Vrba (born 6 December 1963) is a Czech football manager and former player. He is known for applying an offensive football philosophy in the teams he coaches.

As a player, Vrba played for several clubs including Baník Ostrava. As a coach, he led several Czech and Slovak clubs, including a Czech First League record of five seasons in charge of FC Viktoria Plzeň, whom he led to two league titles, one cup title, and three consecutive seasons of participation in the UEFA Europa League knockout stage – a record for any Czech club.

Managerial career

Early career
Having been assistant to manager Erich Cviertna, Vrba took charge of FC Baník Ostrava for a short time towards the end of the 2002–03 Czech First League after Cviertna's departure. His first match in charge resulted in a 7–0 loss for Ostrava away to Slavia Prague.

He won the Slovak Superleague with MŠK Žilina in the 2006–07 season and led the team to second place the following season.

Viktoria Plzeň
In 2010, he led Viktoria Plzeň to the victory in the Czech Cup for the first time in the club history. He was voted the Czech Coach of the Year for 2010. In the 2010–11 season of the Czech First League, he won the league with Viktoria Plzeň for the first time in the club history. Vrba was awarded the title "Czech Coach of the Year" for 2012, symbolising the third consecutive year he had won the award. He led Plzeň to a second league title in 2013. In October 2013 Vrba led Plzen for a 152nd consecutive top-flight match, setting a league record. Despite having a contract with Plzeň until June 2015, the Czech Football Association activated a buy-out clause, paying his club 8 million Czech koruna and he was announced as the new manager of the Czech Republic national football team in November 2013. His last game in charge of the club was the 2013–14 UEFA Champions League group stage tie against CSKA Moscow which Plzeň won 2–1 with a last-minute goal from Tomáš Wágner, thus earning them a place in the Europa League knockout stage. At the end of the match, the fans unfurled a banner reading "always remember that it wasn't wasted time".

Ludogorets Razgrad
On 16 December 2019, Vrba became manager of Bulgarian Ludogorets Razgrad.

Sparta Prague
On 3 February 2021, Vrba became manager of Sparta Prague.

Trinity Zlín
On 28 November 2022, Vrba became manager of Trinity Zlín.

Honours

Managerial
Žilina
Slovak Super Liga: 2006–07
Slovak Super Cup: 2007

Viktoria Plzeň
Czech First League: 2010–11, 2012–13, 2017–18
Czech Cup: 2009–10
Czech Supercup: 2011

Ludogorets Razgrad
First Professional Football League (Bulgaria): 2019–20

Individual
 Czech Coach of the Year (8): 2010, 2011, 2012, 2013, 2014, 2015, 2017, 2018

Managerial statistics

References

External links
 Profile at Viktoria Plzeň website 
 Profile at www.Fotbal24.cz website 
 

1963 births
Living people
Czech footballers
Czechoslovak footballers
FK Hvězda Cheb players
FC Baník Ostrava players
Czech football managers
Czech Republic national football team managers
Czech First League managers
MŠK Žilina managers
Slovak Super Liga managers
FC Baník Ostrava managers
FC Viktoria Plzeň managers
MŠK Púchov managers
Expatriate football managers in Slovakia
UEFA Euro 2016 managers
FC Anzhi Makhachkala managers
Expatriate football managers in Russia
Czech expatriate sportspeople in Slovakia
Czech expatriate sportspeople in Russia
Russian Premier League managers
Association football midfielders
PFC Ludogorets Razgrad managers
Expatriate football managers in Bulgaria
Czech expatriate sportspeople in Bulgaria
Czech expatriate football managers
AC Sparta Prague managers
Sportspeople from Přerov
1. SK Prostějov players
FC Fastav Zlín managers